Hatun or Khatun (or قادین  Kadın,  khātūn; Mongolian: , khatun, хатан khatan;  ,  ; ;; ;) is a female title of nobility and counterpart to "khan" or "Khagan" prominently used in the Turkic Khaganates and in the subsequent Mongol Empire.

Honorific
In the Ottoman period, the term hatun was used as an honorific for women, roughly equivalent to the English term lady and a variant spelling of khatun. Like most Turkish honorifics, it is used after the first name. Women traditionally addressed as hatun include:
 Börte, wife of Genghis Khan
 Buluqhan Khatun, wife of Abaqa Khan
 Bulugan, wife of Temur Khan
 Chabi, wife of Kublai Khan
 Despina Khatun
 Doquz Khatun, wife of Hulagu Khan
 Erketü Qatun, wife of Altan Khan
 Mandukhai Khatun, wife of Dayan Khan
 Momine Khatun
 Oghul Qaimish, wife of Guyuk Khan
 Po Beg
 Radnashiri, wife of Ayurbarwada Buyantu Khan
 Sapnara Khatun, judge elected to the British Family Law Bar Association Committee. In 2006, she was appointed as a Recorder of the British Crown.
 Töregene Khatun, wife of Ogedei Khan
Melike Mama Hatun Saltukid female ruler (reigned between 1191 and 1200)
 Gürcü Hatun (fl. 1237–1286), Georgian royal princess, wife of sultan Kaykhusraw II
 Malhun Hatun (died 1323), wife of Sultan Osman I
 Gülçiçek Hatun (fl. 14th century), wife of Sultan Murad I
 Devlet Hatun (died 1411), wife of Sultan Bayezid I
 Gülfem Hatun (died 1561/1562), consort of Sultan Suleiman the Magnificent
 Şemsiruhsar Hatun (died 1613), consort of Sultan Murad III
 Nene Hatun (1857–1955), Turkish folk heroine
 Halime Hatun (1205-1230) The wife of Ertugrul Ghazi

Valide Hatun 
Valide Hatun was the title held by the "legal mother" of a ruling Sultan of the Ottoman Empire before the 16th century.

By the beginning of the 16th century, the title hatun for sultan's mother, princesses, and sultan's main consort was replaced by "sultan" and they started to carry it after their given names. This usage underlines the Ottoman conception of sovereign power as family prerogative. Consequently, the title valide hatun also turned into valide sultan.

List of valide hatuns

Given name 
 Ayşe Hatun Önal, Turkish model
 Hatun Sürücü, German murder victim

See also 
 List of Ottoman titles and appellations
 Khatun, variant spelling of the word
 Umm walad

References

Turkish feminine given names
Ottoman titles
Women from the Ottoman Empire
Ottoman royalty
Concubinage
Concubines of the Ottoman Empire